Michael Tomalaris is an Australian television reporter and presenter. He has previously been host of SBS Television's programs including the Tour de France coverage.

He has also previously been a member of the presentation team at the network's flagship SBS World News.

Tomalaris is one of the longest-serving members of the team behind SBS Sports and is the anchor fronting the Australian public television broadcaster's cycling programs. After working on such events as the 1992 and 1996 UEFA European Football Championship and the 1994, 1998, 2002, 2006 and 2010 FIFA World Cup tournaments as reporter and host, he has since focused on developing the network's Tour de France coverage. He was recognised by the Australian Sports Commission for "Most Outstanding Contribution to a Sport by an Individual" at the 2011 annual awards.

Career
His break into television was in 1987 when Les Murray asked him to provide commentary for a National Soccer League match and, after working initially in print journalism, Tomalaris returned to SBS full-time in 1992 and became recognised as a commentator for NSL games, Socceroos and Olyroos international broadcasts.

Through SBS he has raised cycling's profile by initially covering the now defunct Commonwealth Bank Cycle Classic from 1992 and, in 1996, the start of the Tour de France in the Netherlands. He has covered the race for SBS ever since, and is the network's main anchor of its international cycling portfolio which includes events such as the Tour Down Under, the Giro d'Italia, the Vuelta a España the Tour of California and Paris–Roubaix. SBS covered the Tour of Flanders live for the first time in 2011. On Sunday afternoons, he hosts the network's Cycling Central series – the only such program dedicated to the sport.
SBS has received three Logie nominations for "Best Sport Coverage", for its production of the Tour de France.

Tomalaris was a part of the World Sport team – before its demise in 2006 – as a reporter and presenter and combined football commentary with reporting and hosting cycling events. He also covered the 2006 FIFA World Cup and was part of the presentation team for SBS complementary coverage of the Athens Olympic Games in 2004 and Beijing Olympics in 2008. He has been a member of the nightly World News team for several years sharing the duties with Craig Foster. He was one of the hosts for the network's coverage of the 2010 FIFA World Cup and has covered every FIFA World Cup for the network either as a reporter or presenter, since 1994.

In July 2011, SBS enjoyed record viewing numbers as a result of Cadel Evans becoming the first Australian to win the Tour de France.
In 2014, SBS was one of four free-to-air television networks in the world to broadcast every stage of the Giro d'Italia.

Tomolaris instigated and has supported an annual charity bicycle ride, The Johnny Warren Jamberoo Classic, in honour of his former colleague and Socceroos captain Johnny Warren (1943–2004) to raise funds for Chris O'Brien's Lifehouse at Sydney's Royal Prince Alfred Hospital. Tomalaris is a keen cyclist and is patron and member of the Sydney Uni Velo Club.

References

Australian television presenters
Australian sports broadcasters
Australian people of Greek descent
Association football commentators
Cycling journalists
People educated at Sydney Technical High School
Living people
Year of birth missing (living people)